Thug Talk is a mixtape by American rapper Boosie Badazz. It was released on March 16, 2016 via Badazz Music Syndicate. Production was handled by G Luck & B Don, Stoopid Beatz, 20k, Backpack, Decky On Da Track, Evil G and Nicholas "Fouryn" Baker among others. It features guest appearances from Webbie, Z-Ro and the late Pimp C. The album debuted at number 130 on the Billboard 200, number 14 on the Top R&B/Hip-Hop Albums, number 10 on the Top Rap Albums and number 11 on the Independent Albums charts in the United States.

Critical reception

Israel Daramola of Pitchfork resumed: "after a scary bout with cancer, Boosie Badazz has a new lease on life and is releasing new music at a steady clip. Thug Talk is another hard memorandum on the turmoil of gangsta life". AllMusic's David Jeffries wrote: "this street release adds to the pile of 2016 LPs from Boosie Badazz, all of them worth a listen. Unlike others that spoke to the MC's battle with cancer, Thug Talk does just what it says on the tin, offering a series of tracks about street crime and drug dealing. Preaching isn't his thing, and yet the MC's honesty and cold, hard facts are deterrents set to banging beats. A posthumous Pimp C interview on the cut "Wake Up" underlines this view, while the streetwise MCs Webbie and Z-Ro are the sharp album's only guests".

Track listing

Charts

References

External link

2016 mixtape albums
Lil Boosie albums